Martin Lucas (16 October 1894 – 3 March 1969) was a Catholic archbishop and diplomat of the Holy See.

Biography
Lucas was born in Haarlem, Netherlands, on 16 October 1894. He was ordained a priest of the Society of the Divine Word on 26 October 1924. He was appointed Apostolic Delegate to South Africa and Titular Archbishop of Adulis on 14 September 1945. On 29 October 1945 he was ordained a bishop by Cardinal Pietro Fumasoni Biondi, while the co-consecrators were Archbishop Celso Benigno Luigi Costantini and Bishop Johannes Hendrik Olav Smit.

On 3 December 1952 he was appointed the Apostolic Internuncio to India. From 1956 to 1959, he served as an official of the Secretariat of State in Rome. On 16 April 1959 he was named the first Apostolic Delegate to Scandinavia, with responsibility for Denmark, Norway, and Sweden. He resigned in October 1961.

Lucas attended the Second Vatican Council.

References

External links
 catholic-hierarchy.org

1894 births
1969 deaths
Apostolic Nuncios to India
Apostolic Nuncios to South Africa